Rhodopirellula caenicola is a Gram-negative, strictly aerobic and non-motile bacterium from the genus of Rhodopirellula which has been isolated from isolated from iron sand.

References

Bacteria described in 2015
Planctomycetota